The 51st, or Pepperrell's Regiment of Foot was a British Army regiment first raised in 1745.

History
The regiment was first raised by Sir William Pepperrell in Massachusetts as Sir William Pepperell's Regiment of Foot and ranked as the 66th Regiment of Foot in September 1745. It was disbanded in May 1749.

The regiment was re-raised in New England as the 51st Regiment of Foot (Cape Breton Regiment) in December 1754 for service in the French and Indian War but, following the disastrous loss of Oswego, it was disbanded in December 1756.

References

Infantry regiments of the British Army
Military units and formations of the French and Indian War
Military units and formations established in 1754
1754 establishments in the British Empire